That Devil Quemado is a 1925 American silent Western film directed by Del Andrews and starring Fred Thomson, Albert Prisco, and Nola Luxford.

Plot
As described in a film magazine review, Quemado is a daring, mysterious character who kidnaps any woman he wants in the little border town of Sonora. He meets Joanna Thatcher, daughter of a wealthy Easterner, and kidnaps her, too. She falls madly in love with him and, after he cleverly saves one of his henchmen from death, discovers that Quemado is a former classmate of one of her brothers.

Cast

References

Bibliography
 Munden, Kenneth White. The American Film Institute Catalog of Motion Pictures Produced in the United States, Part 1. University of California Press, 1997.

External links

 

1925 films
1925 Western (genre) films
Films directed by Del Andrews
Film Booking Offices of America films
American black-and-white films
Silent American Western (genre) films
1920s English-language films
1920s American films